This list of museums in Tennessee encompasses museums defined for this context as institutions (including nonprofit organizations, government entities, and private businesses) that collect and care for objects of cultural, artistic, scientific, or historical interest and make their collections or related exhibits available for public viewing. Museums that exist only in cyberspace (i.e., virtual museums) are not included.

Museums

Defunct museums
 Beale Street Police Museum, Memphis, closed in 2005. 
 Breweriana Museum, Millersville
 Carbo's Smoky Mountain Police Museum, Pigeon Forge
 Chattanooga History Center, Chattanooga, closed in 2017, collections now at the Chattanooga Public Library and the University of Tennessee at Chattanooga
 Chattanooga Model Railroad Museum, Chattanooga, closed in 2015, may reopen in the Chattanooga Choo Choo Hotel in the future
 Dinosaur Walk Museum, Pigeon Forge, closed in 2011
 Grand Guitar Museum, Bristol
 Howard H. Baker Jr. Museum, Knoxville, formerly part of the Howard H. Baker Jr. Center for Public Policy, closed in 2012, exhibits on display around the facility
 Museum of Tobacco Art and History, Nashville, closed in 1998
 Music Valley Wax Museum, Nashville
 Obion County Museum, Union City, closed in 2012, collections moved to Discovery Park of Americar
 Smoky Mountain Car Museum, Pigeon Forge
 Soda Museum, Springfield, also known as the Museum of Beverage Containers and Advertising
 World of the Unexplained museum, Gatlinburg

See also
 Nature Centers in Tennessee

References

External links

Tennessee Association of Museums

Tennessee History for Kids

Museums
Tennessee
Museums